Pleasant Corners is an unincorporated community located in Mahoning Township in Carbon County, Pennsylvania. Pleasant Corners is located on Pennsylvania Route 902 between Normal Square and Lehighton.

References

Unincorporated communities in Carbon County, Pennsylvania
Unincorporated communities in Pennsylvania